"Something Better Change" is a single by The Stranglers from the 1977 album No More Heroes. It made No. 9 in the UK Singles Chart. It was a double A-sided release, with the song "Straighten Out", which was a non-album track. It was covered on Stranglers' vocalist Hugh Cornwell's 2011 live solo album Live and Kickin' (The Dave Cash Collection), Morgan Fisher's 1979 conceptual cover album Hybrid Kids 1 in the style of The Residents and on Columbus, Ohio band Great Plains' 1985 album Slaves To Rock N Roll.

Charts

References

The Stranglers songs
1977 singles
Song recordings produced by Martin Rushent
1977 songs
United Artists Records singles
Songs written by Hugh Cornwell
Songs written by Dave Greenfield
Songs written by Jet Black
Songs written by Jean-Jacques Burnel